Events from the year 1657 in France

Incumbents
 Monarch – Louis XIV

Events
March – The Treaty of Paris allied the English Protectorate of Oliver Cromwell with King Louis XIV of France against King Philip IV of Spain.
The 54th Infantry Regiment was formed.

Births

11 February – Bernard Le Bovier de Fontenelle, writer (d. 1757)
25 May – Henri-Pons de Thiard de Bissy, bishop and cardinal (d. 1737)
16 June – Louis Ellies Dupin, ecclesiastical historian (d. 1719)
24 July – Jean Mathieu de Chazelles, hydrographer (d. 1710)
7 August – Henri Basnage de Beauval, Huguenot historian, lexicographer and journal editor (d. 1710)
9 August – Pierre-Étienne Monnot, sculptor (d. 1733)
15 December – Michel Richard Delalande, composer and organist (d. 1726)

Full date missing
Jean-François de Chamillart, churchman (d. 1714)
Anne Ferrand, writer (d. 1740)
Pierre-Charles Le Sueur, fur trader and explorer (d. 1704)
Jean-Baptiste Nolin, cartographer and engraver (d. 1708) 
Jacques Savary des Brûlons, lexicographer (d. 1716)
Sébastien Truchet, Dominican priest, scientist and inventor (d. 1729)

Deaths

19 February – Jean Riolan the Younger, anatomist (b. 1577 or 1580)
24 March – Philippe de La Mothe-Houdancourt, count and marshal (b. 1605)
24 December – Philippe Le Sueur de Petiville, poet (b. 1607)

Full date missing
Pompone de Bellièvre, magistrate, ambassador and statesman (b. 1606)
Françoise de Lansac, courtier (b. 1582)

See also

References

1650s in France